Zoran Ivanović (born 27 August 1949) is a Yugoslav gymnast. He competed in eight events at the 1972 Summer Olympics.

References

1949 births
Living people
Yugoslav male artistic gymnasts
Olympic gymnasts of Yugoslavia
Gymnasts at the 1972 Summer Olympics
Place of birth missing (living people)